The 2009 Evening Standard Theatre Awards were announced on 2009. The shortlist was revealed on 2009 and the longlist on 2 November 2009.

Winners, shortlist and longlist

 = winner

Best Play
  Jerusalem by Jez Butterworth (Royal Court)

Longlisted
 August: Osage County by Tracy Letts (Steppenwolf/National)
 England People Very Nice by Richard Bean (National)
 Enron by Lucy Prebble (Royal Court)
 Our Class by Tadeusz Slobodzianek/Ryan Craig (National)
 Pornography by Simon Stephens (Tricycle)
 Punk Rock by Simon Stephens (Lyric Hammersmith)
 Tusk Tusk by Polly Stenham (Royal Court)
 When The Rain Stops Falling by Andrew Bovell (Almeida)

Best Director
  Rupert Goold for Enron (Royal Court)

Longlisted
 Howard Davies for Burnt by the Sun (National)
 Marianne Elliott for All's Well That Ends Well (National)
 Richard Eyre for The Last Cigarette (Trafalgar Studios) and The Observer (National)
 Jeremy Herrin for Tusk Tusk (Royal Court)
 Janice Honeyman for The Tempest (RSC Stratford/Richmond)
 Sean Mathias for Waiting For Godot (Theatre Royal Haymarket)
 Sam Mendes for The Winter's Tale (Old Vic)
 Ian Rickson for Jerusalem (Royal Court)
 Anna D Shapiro for August: Osage County (Steppenwolf/National)

Best Actor
  Mark Rylance, Jerusalem (Royal Court)

Longlisted
 Bertie Carvel, The Pride, (Royal Court)
 Michael Feast, Plague Over England (Duchess)
 Henry Goodman, Duet For One (Almeida/Vaudeville)
 David Harewood, The Mountaintop (Theatre 503/Trafalgar Studios)
 Matthew Kelly, Who's Afraid Of Virginia Woolf (Trafalgar Studios) & Troilus And Cressida (Shakespeare's Globe)
 Ian McKellen, Waiting For Godot (Theatre Royal Haymarket)
 Simon Russell Beale, The Winter's Tale (Old Vic)
 Kevin Spacey, Inherit The Wind (Old Vic)
 Ken Stott, A View From The Bridge (Duke of York's)
 David Tennant, Hamlet (RSC Stratford/Novello)
 David Troughton, Enjoy (Gielgud) & Inherit The Wind (Old Vic)
 Samuel West, Enron (Royal Court)

Natasha Richardson Award for Best Actress
  Rachel Weisz, A Streetcar Named Desire (Donmar Warehouse)

Longlisted
 Samantha Bond, Arcadia (Duke of York's)
 Deanna Dunagan, August: Osage County (Steppenwolf/ National)
 Penny Downie, Helen (Shakespeare's Globe)
 Rebecca Hall, The Winter's Tale (Old Vic)
 Pauline Malefane, The Mysteries (Garrick)
 Lyndsey Marshal, The Pride (Royal Court)
 Mary Elizabeth Mastrantonio, A View From The Bridge (Duke of York's)
 Amy Morton, August: Osage County (Steppenwolf/ National)
 Juliet Stevenson, Duet For One (Almeida/Vaudeville)
 Michelle Terry, England People Very Nice (National)

Ned Sherrin Award for Best Musical
  Hello, Dolly! (Open Air, Regent's Park)

Longlisted
 A Little Night Music (Menier Chocolate Factory/Garrick)
 Been So Long (Young Vic)
 The Mysteries (Garrick)
 Spring Awakening (Lyric Hammersmith/Novello)
 Sunset Boulevard (Comedy)

Best Design
  Mamoru Iriguchi, Mincemeat (Cardboard Citizens/Cordy House, Shoreditch)

Longlisted
 Jon Bausor, Kursk (Young Vic)
 Miriam Buether, Judgement Day (Almeida)
 Lez Brotherston, Dancing At Lughnasa (Old Vic)
 Bob Crowley, Phedre (National) & The Power Of Yes (National)
 Rob Howell, The Observer (National)
 Peter McKintosh, Prick Up Your Ears (Comedy)
 Vicki Mortimer, Burnt by The Sun (National)
 Christopher Oram, Hamlet, Madame de Sade, Twelfth Night (Donmar at Wyndham's), A Streetcar Named Desire (Donmar Warehouse)
 Todd Rosenthal, August: Osage County (National)
 Ultz, Jerusalem (Royal Court)

Charles Wintour Award for Most Promising Playwright
  Alia Bano, Shades (Royal Court)

Longlisted
 Kieron Barry, Stockwell (Landor & Tricycle)
 Lucy Kirkwood, It Felt Empty When The Heart Went At First But It Is Alright Now (Arcola)
 Molly Davies, A Miracle (Royal Court)
 Katori Hall, The Mountaintop (Theatre 503 & Trafalgar Studios)
 Ella Hickson, Eight (Trafalgar Studios)
 Alexi Kaye Campbell, The Pride (Royal Court) & Apologia (Bush)

Milton Shulman Award for Outstanding Newcomer
  Lenny Henry, Othello (Northern Broadsides at Trafalgar Studios)

Longlisted
 Naana Agyei-Ampadu, Been So Long (Young Vic)
 Aneurin Barnard, Spring Awakening (Lyric Hammersmith)
 Ruth Negga, Phedre (National)
 Bel Powley, Tusk Tusk (Royal Court)
 Toby Regbo, Tusk Tusk (Royal Court)
 Tom Sturridge, Punk Rock (Lyric Hammersmith)
 Charlotte Wakefield, Spring Awakening (Lyric Hammersmith & Novello)
 Phoebe Waller-Bridge, 2nd May 1997 (Bush)

Judges
 Henry Hitchings of the Standard
 Susannah Clapp of The Observer
 Matt Wolf of the International Herald Tribune
 Georgina Brown of The Mail on Sunday
 Charles Spencer from the Daily Telegraph
 Sarah Sands, London Evening Standard
 Evgeny Lebedev, London Evening Standard

References

Evening Standard Theatre Awards ceremonies
Evening
Evening